Ozyptila  is a crab spider species found in Switzerland and Italy.

References

External links 

secreta
Spiders of Europe
Spiders described in 1987